Hands of Stone is a 2016 American biographical sports film about the career of Panamanian former professional boxer Roberto Durán. It is directed and written by Jonathan Jakubowicz. It stars Édgar Ramírez, Robert De Niro, Usher, Ruben Blades, Pedro "Budu" Pérez, Ellen Barkin, Ana de Armas, Oscar Jaenada and John Turturro. The film premiered at Cannes on May 16, 2016 and 
was released on August 26, 2016, by The Weinstein Company.

Plot 
Growing up in Panama, Durán is homeschooled by Chaflan, who teaches young Roberto some vital life lessons. Later, Duran joins a boxing club with Nestor "Plomo" Quiñones as his coach.

As he reaches 20, an American legendary boxing trainer Ray Arcel, who nearly lost his life after being attacked by an unknown assailant in 1953 in New York City and is now living with his wife Stephanie, notices Roberto's raw talent and punching power and takes the young fighter under his wing, becoming his coach. Not long after, Durán then meets a student, Felicidad, with whom he later has five children.

After his fights through the 70s and 80s, rising through the divisions with phenomenal success (just one loss) he challenges Sugar Ray Leonard, dubbed as the "Fighter of the Year." However, Durán is disrespectful to Leonard, describing him as a "clown" and confidently predicts a knock outwin for himself.

One night, Durán insults Leonard in front of his wife by calling him a "homosexual". The incident angers Leonard. Durán's hard feelings for Leonard seem to stem from his resentment of Americans in general, because he recalls the ill-treatment meted out by the Americans to the nation of Panama, remembering how American troops took over the country by owning the Panama Canal—leading to conflict between the sides in 1964.

In June 1980 in Montreal, the day of fight between Durán and Leonard; Durán wins via unanimous decision as a welterweight champion (148–147, 145–144). After the fight, Leonard states that being insulted is a strategy and calls for a rematch with an $8 million purse. At the house party, Durán is informed by his manager Carlos Eleta and he reluctantly agrees to the rematch. Chaflan is killed after being run over by a truck.

In November 1980, Durán and Leonard face in the ring for the second time, this time the venue is in New Orleans. But in the eighth round, Durán gives up by saying "No más" (English: "No more") to the referee, angering the entire Panamanian community, thus Leonard wins via technical knockout (68–66, 68–66, and ).

Upon returning home to Panama, he faces angry protests. Durán tells his wife that he regrets letting them down and needs to go back in the ring in order to regain his popularity and the forgiveness of his fans. Due to this incident, Arcel is retired from his training and tells Durán that Plomo will be his coach. In June 1983, New York City, the day of his fight against Davey Moore, Leonard gratefully meets Durán for the first time since the rematch, saying that he forgives Durán. He tells Leonard that he gives his apology to his wife. As the fight with Moore goes up to the eighth round, in which Leonard is the commentator, Durán wins the fight via technical knockout and eventually restores his popularity and dignity with the people of Panama.

In the film's epilogue, it states that Plomo was in Durán's side for each fight until Plomo's death in 2012; Leonard and Durán remain friends until the present; Ray Arcel was the first boxing trainer to be inducted into both the World Boxing Hall of Fame (WBHF) as the International Boxing Hall of Fame (IBHF). He died on March 7, 1994, at the age of 94 after a six-year battle with leukemia.

Cast 
 Édgar Ramírez as Roberto Durán
 Robert De Niro as Ray Arcel
 Usher as Sugar Ray Leonard Credited as "Usher Raymond IV".
 Oscar Jaenada as Chaflan
 Jurnee Smollett-Bell as Juanita Leonard
 Ellen Barkin as Stephanie Arcel
 Rubén Blades as Carlos Eleta
 Pedro Pérez as Plomo Quiñones
 Ana de Armas as Felicidad Iglesias
 John Turturro as Frankie Carbo
 Eliud Kauffman as Margarito Duran
 John Duddy as Ken Buchanan
 Joe Urla as Angelo Dundee
 Reg E. Cathey as Don King (Uncredited)

Production 

Production on the film began in December 2013 in Panama. Principal photography was completed in March 2014.  The film was dedicated in memory of Stephanie Arcel "your legacy is love".

Release

In May 2015, The Weinstein Company acquired distribution rights to the film, with a 2,000 screen commitment. The film was scheduled to be released on August 26, 2016 in 800 theaters before expanding to 2,500 theaters on Wednesday August 31.

Reception

Box office
Hands of Stone was released on August 26, 2016 and was projected to gross around $2–3 million from 810 theaters in its opening weekend. In its limited opening weekend the film grossed $1.7 million, finishing 16th at the box office. In its second weekend, despite being added to 1,201 theaters, the film grossed just $1.3 million, finishing 20th at the box office.

Critical response
On Rotten Tomatoes, the film has an approval rating of 44% based on 106 reviews, with an average rating of 5.34/10. The website's critics consensus reads: "Hands of Stone's strong cast and fascinating real-life story aren't enough to compensate for a crowded narrative and formulaic script." On Metacritic, the film has a weighted average score of 54 out of 100, based on 31 critic reviews, indicating "mixed or average reviews". Audiences polled by CinemaScore gave the film an average grade of "A" on an A+ to F scale.

Owen Gleiberman of Variety magazine wrote: "Gets the job done, but it's hard to escape the feeling that you're watching a routinely conceived, rather generic boxing flick. It's utterly competent, yet it makes Duran's story seem a little so-what?"

References

External links 
 

2016 films
2016 action films
2010s biographical films
2010s sports films
American action films
American biographical films
American boxing films
Films set in the 1960s
Films set in the 1980s
Films set in 1980
Films set in 2002
Films set in the Las Vegas Valley
Films set in Montreal
Films set in New Orleans
Films set in New York City
Films set in Panama
Films shot in Panama
2010s Spanish-language films
Biographical films about sportspeople
The Weinstein Company films
Cultural depictions of boxers
Cultural depictions of Panamanian people
2010s English-language films
2010s American films